Glacier Dome is a lava dome in northwestern British Columbia, Canada, located near Mount Edziza in Mount Edziza Provincial Park. It last erupted during the Pleistocene epoch.

See also
List of volcanoes in Canada
List of Northern Cordilleran volcanoes
Volcanism of Canada
Volcanism of Western Canada

References

Volcanoes of British Columbia
One-thousanders of British Columbia
Pleistocene lava domes
Cassiar Land District